Abin Sur is a superhero appearing in American comic books published by DC Comics. He was a member of the Green Lantern Corps and is best known as the predecessor of Green Lantern Hal Jordan, whom Abin Sur's power ring chose as his replacement. After the Infinite Crisis events, details of Abin Sur's past is altered and was revealed to be a brother-in-law of Sinestro and uncle of his daughter Soranik Natu. He was modeled after Yul Brynner.

Publication history
Abin Sur first appeared in Showcase #22 and was created by John Broome and Gil Kane.

Fictional character biography
Originally a history professor on the planet Ungara, Abin Sur is appointed Green Lantern of Space Sector 2814 in the mid-1860s. As a child, he became best friends with Ruch Ehr and later, by association, Munni Jah. The two of them were a couple and Abin secretly loved Munni, but never spoke openly of this.

Recruited by the Green Lantern known as Starkaor, he is known to have come to Earth on several occasions. In the American Old West, he teams up with an ancestor of Hal Jordan's to battle an alien named Traitor (who was responsible for the death of Starkaor). Abin would then wield Starkaor's ring after his mentor's death. In 1873, while severely wounded, he recruits the lawman Daniel Young to be a temporary Green Lantern. During World War II, he encounters Starman and Bulletman when the three battle an alien being under the control of Mr. Mind. On a later visit, his ring's power is neutralized by the foe he is tracking. He discovers the unconscious forms of Alan Scott and Jay Garrick, and borrows Scott's slightly different ring. He uses it against his adversary, taking advantage of the ring's effectiveness against the color yellow. He also visits Earth at some point between the Golden and Silver Ages, when he encounters the Martian Manhunter. At one point, Abin Sur imprisons the evil wizard Myrhydden inside his own ring, depriving him of the voice needed to cast his spells. Later, he is sent to retrieve Earth's most infamous gangster, Al Magone, whose evil had brought him to the notice of the Guardians. Abin Sur imprisoned Magone on a prison planet where time did not pass, an action that would have ripples throughout the Corps for decades to come.

Crash and death
While on patrol, he is attacked and pursued by the being known as Legion while on its way to Oa. Pre-Crisis his ship was hit by yellow sun radiation. Badly injured and with his spaceship seriously damaged, he makes an emergency landing on the nearest habitable planet (Earth). Due to his injuries, Sur was aware that his death was inevitable and he uses his ring to search for a successor, a man without fear. The first possibility was Clark Kent. Since he was not native to Earth, he is not chosen. The next candidates were Hal Jordan and Guy Gardner. As Jordan was closer, the ring chose him as the most suitable replacement right before Sur's death, and brings him to Sur, who gives him the ring. Pre-Crisis Hal first tested his ring by lifting a mountain, then hid the ship and Sur's remains under it, as Sur had told him to dispose of them. Later it is shown these were the Sierre Madre mountains. Hal had made sure to bury Sur in nearly inaccessible area and leave a small stone marker.

For a brief time during Zero Hour, he was pulled into the present, where he assists the Darkstars in their battle against Entropy. A Darkstar from Abin's own time, one he is familiar with, supports them all. Both are unexpectedly returned to their own era at the end of the battle.

In the afterlife Sur is able to help Jordan again when Jordan enters the realm of the death lord, Nekron. Jordan is attempting to stop Nekron from entering the living universe and destroying it. Jordan manages to incite the spirits of the deceased members of the Corps to destroy the god long enough for the Guardians to drive Krona and his forces back and seal the portal. Before the sealing was complete, Sur helps his successor exit the realm while saying how proud he was of Jordan. Abin Sur later sacrifices his soul to assist the Swamp Thing in rescuing his infant daughter Tefé Holland from the demon Nergal in Hell.

Abin Sur's afterlife is further disrupted when unknown events send him back to Earth. He attempts to assist the Green Lantern Kyle Rayner in investigating the situation but is torn away against his will.

It is later revealed that part of his soul was still being tortured in Hell while his spirit was acting as a companion to Hal Jordan during his brief stint as the Spectre. Eventually, he frees his soul from Hell and assisted Hal Jordan on several spiritual adventures and metaphysical dilemmas. Eventually, Abin Sur engaged in the Karamm-Jeev Descent, an Ungaran form of reincarnation, and was reborn as Lagzia, daughter of Sur's old friends Ruch Ehr and Munni Jah.

During some point in his life, Abin sires a son, Amon Sur, who grew up to become leader of the Black Circle crime syndicate. Amon is angry at his deceased father for abandoning him for the Corps, and decides to take his anger out on all Green Lanterns. Amon is eventually stopped by Hal Jordan's successor, Kyle Rayner and a second-generation Guardian of the Universe called Lianna. Amon eventually has a confrontation with Hal Jordan himself, who had returned to his position as Green Lantern after being both resurrected and freed from the influence of Parallax. Hal defeats Amon, but Amon received a duplicate of Sinestro's ring from the Qwardians and vanishes. After Hal finally took Abin's body home and buried it, a mysterious yellow light appears in the sky after Hal left.

The Prophecy
During Sinestro Corps War, it is revealed that Abin discovered a prophecy concerning the Multiverse, The Powers of the Emotional Spectrum, and The Blackest Night prior to his death. Green Lantern: Secret Origin, reveals details of Abin's quest to learn more about The Blackest Night as he interrogated The Five Inversions on Ysmault, who had foreseen the prophecy. He learns that Earth is the birthplace of The Black: the antithesis of the emotional spectrum that the prophecy predicts will "one day consume all light and all life." He discovers that the prophecy foretells his own death, when his ring fails him in his time of greatest need. He subsequently journeys to Earth in an effort to learn more about The Blackest Night, so that he might stop the prophecy's fulfillment. During his quest, Abin Sur begins to lose his faith in his willpower and his ring, and begins to feel fear. His weakened willpower results in his ring creating correspondingly weaker constructs, allowing his prisoner, Atrocitus, to break free and attack him, and cause his ship to crash on Earth. Abin Sur is critically injured in the crash, leading him to instruct his ring to seek out a successor and the ring chose Hal Jordan. His discovery of the prophecy from The Five Inversions was noted in the Book of Oa. However, this was believed to be a lie from their enemies and one of the Guardians, later named Scar, burned the page which has Sur's prophecy years later. Only two Guardians, Ganthet and Sayd, as well as a Zamaron tribe, would take his discovery seriously.

"Blackest Night"

In the "Blackest Night" storyline, the finale of the prophecy becomes reality. A black power ring reaches Abin Sur's grave on Ungara and bids him to rise. A flashback to Sur's past reveals that he once had a sister named Arin, whom Sinestro was romancing before her death due to unknown circumstances. Indigo-1, leader of the Indigo Tribe also claimed to have met Abin before his death. Black Lantern Abin and Arin arrive on Korugar shortly after, ready to confront Sinestro and Hal Jordan. They are defeated by the combined efforts of Jordan, Sinestro, Indigo-1, and Carol Ferris, who join their lights together to destroy the black rings, rendering Abin and Arin's corpses inert. Before dying, Abin states that he recognizes Indigo-1. In Blackest Night #5, the Indigo Tribe oath is revealed, and includes a line which mentions a lantern and Abin Sur's name. Due to the Indigo Tribe oath being spoken in an unintelligible language, no further details are known.

During Krona's takeover of the Green Lantern Corps, Sinestro and other ring-wielders are briefly trapped in the Book of the Black and experience visions of their pre-ring pasts, with Sinestro encountering a pre-Tribe Indigo-1 locked in a prison and trying to find out where Abin Sur has imprisoned her, but Sinestro departs to focus on his own escape rather than try to rescue her, leaving her history a continued mystery. It is later revealed that Abin Sur had discovered the Indigo light on the planet Nok during a mission, which he along with Natromo forged it into a battery, with Abin Sur bringing Indigo-1 who was allegedly his worst enemy and responsible for the death of his daughter to the planet to become the first Indigo Tribe, all subsequent members of the Tribe being selected as the worst psychopaths of their worlds. Abin Sur did this as he foresaw the danger that the Guardians of the Universe would pose once the "Blackest Night" had passed, and sought to find a way to stop the Guardians by changing them due to the impossibility of killing them.

DC Rebirth
Subsequently, in DC Rebirth, Abin Sur appears in an unknown world of Emerald Space where the Green Lantern Corps were memorial in the afterlife. When Hal Jordan is transported into Emerald Space after defeated Sinestro in battle, Abin Sur introduces himself and explains to Hal that he does not belong to Emerald Space. When Hal is about to returned the universe. Abin Sur then tells Hal that the Green Lantern Corps are awaits him to find hope.

Abin Sur's home planet of Ungara has been featured during a storyline about refugees. Two Lanterns, Jessica Cruz and Simon Baz, bring 'Molites' to Ungara, but not all are welcoming. Simon and Jessica make friends with several Ungarans who honor the nobility of Abin Sur and thus have no problems with the Molites.

Spaceship
The question was raised of why Abin Sur needed a ship, but in the Green Lantern Origins serial, it is stated that out of paranoia of the prophecy of his destruction, he navigated the cosmos in a ship filled with weapons, not trusting the powers of his ring, as the prophecy stated that his ring would fail him when he needed it most.

Pre-Crisis explanation
In the story "Earth's First Green Lantern," Jordan revealed that he wondered that himself and asked his ring to explain.

The ring told the story of how Abin Sur found a world which was still at a Middle Age stage of advancement even though it should have been in the atomic age, and discovered a parasitic energy being species that fed on sentient beings' "I-factor," a substance that enabled inventiveness, attacking civilizations and stalling their development, as they had no I-factor themselves. Sur captured them to stop their destruction, placing them in a bubble, but one of their number had escaped as it was attacking another world and vowed to free his brethren. To do so, he tracked down Sur's planet and created a disaster by making a volcano erupt to force him to appear to stop it. Since Sur did not mask himself, the being recognized him immediately and followed him to his home. As Sur neglected to charge his ring before going to sleep, he was unable to stop the being from taking control of him.

With the being in control of his body and about to force him to go and free his fellows, Sur tricked the being into thinking that he would not be able to do so because the ring would be low on power after the trip there while in reality the ring's charge is purely time based. The being decided to have Sur take a ship to the destination, but before leaving, Sur managed to get a hold of his invisible power battery without the creature noticing. On the ship, Sur piloted the ship and waited until he moved into a green colored planetary radiation belt which allowed Sur to charge his ring without the being noticing, as his ring glowed green when recharging. Thus armed, Sur battled and captured the being, sending it of into orbit of the same star that his fellow beings were imprisoned at. However, during the fight, the ship wandered into Earth's radiation belt. With his ring useless, Sur lost control of the battered ship and crashed. Mortally wounded, Sur sought out his replacement and drew Jordan to him. Jordan learnt of this from the ring.

According to Jordan, this account prompted him to keep a secret identity as a security precaution and to carefully navigate around Earth's radiation belts.

Post-Crisis explanation
In Tales of the Green Lantern Corps Annual #2 (1986) story "Tygers", writer Alan Moore answered the question with a story of how the hero once visited Ysmault, a prison planet for an ancient race of demons, the Empire of Tears, vanquished millennia ago by the Oans. He was on a rescue mission and felt he could not wait for instruction from the Guardians.

While there, Abin Sur met a demon named Qull of the Five Inversions, a humanoid with a gaping mouth in his chest and a tongue-shaped head, crucified by three glowing spikes topped with the symbol of the Green Lantern Corps. This unholy messiah predicted the hero would die when his power ring ran out of energy at a critical moment, while he was fighting an opponent or unprotected in hard vacuum. Abin Sur, worried by this prophecy, began using a starship for interstellar voyages, as an additional safeguard.

A decade later, fleeing his enemy, his spaceship collided with a girdle of yellow radiation around Earth that rendered his starship and his power-ring useless within moments. Had he relied on his ring alone, he realized, he might have tested the planet's magnetosphere before rashly entering it. Thus, while Legion may have wounded him, it could be argued that it was Qull that was actually responsible for Abin Sur's death, having sown the seeds of doubt in the Green Lantern's mind.

Green Lantern: Secret Origin

In the Secret Origins arc (Green Lantern vol. 4), Abin Sur's final fate was tweaked again to incorporate elements of the Parallax impurity. Still forced to use a starship due to his growing fear of impending death, Abin Sur dies while escorting Atrocitus, another prisoner of the Empire of Tears to Earth in his search for the Black Energies foretold to bring on the Blackest Night. Atrocitus successfully manages to free himself and Abin Sur is left to choose between a crash landing on Coast City, or a riskier one in the desert nearby. Abin Sur chooses sacrifice, and lands in the desert. He dies of his wounds after warning Sinestro, still a loyal Lantern at the time, and designating Hal Jordan as his successor.

Other versions

Crime Syndicate
In the Crime Syndicate's universe, Abin Sur's ring hosted the malevolent, ancient entity Volthoom. When Abin crashed to Earth, the ring chose a cowardly janitor employed by Carol Ferris.

Earth One
The corpse of Abin Sur is discovered in the asteroid belt by astronaut turned miner Hal Jordan, along with his Ring and Battery, as well as a deactivated Manhunter. The Lantern was presumably killed in the initial purge of the Green Lantern Corps by the Manhunters.

Flashpoint
In the alternate timeline of the Flashpoint event, Abin Sur is still the Green Lantern of Sector 2814. As the Blackest Night falls in the universe, Abin Sur is dispatched to Earth by the Guardians of the Universe with the mission to retrieve the White Lantern Entity and bring it back to Oa. While reaching planet Earth, Abin Sur's ship is damaged by a laser and he's forced to crash land on the planet. He survives and is approached by Hal Jordan, but is subsequently taken into custody by Cyborg and the US government to be questioned about his reasons for being on Earth. Although he agrees to work with Earth's heroes, he is subsequently attacked by Sinestro, who reveals that he has learned of the prophecy of the "Flashpoint", the moment when everything changes and the original world that existed before this one, during which it is revealed that Abin's home planet has been destroyed in this reality. Seeking the power of the Flash so that he can restore history according to his own vision rather than another, Sinestro cuts off Abin's hand, severing his connection with his ring. The ring then flies onto Abin's other hand, and he manages to defeat and imprison Sinestro. The Guardians then contact Abin, demanding that he bring the Entity to them, and refusing to listen to Sinestro's talk of "the Flashpoint". They then discharge Abin from the Corps, telling him that the ring will find a new wielder when it runs out of power. Abin joins the battle in Europe, and, when a cataclysmic earthquake starts, dives into the crevice, just before his ring runs out of power. The Entity then bonds with Abin, and he sees a vision of his sister, telling him to truly experience life, rather than just living it. Abin then flies into space, and attempts to heal the damage made to the Earth.
This version of Abin appears in the Convergence crossover, incorrectly believing the Flashpoint Gotham is endangered by another Superman.

In Darkest Knight
In this alternate universe, Bruce Wayne, unsure and confused over his chosen vigilante mission, is picked as Abin Sur's successor. He receives the ring moments before Abin passes away from his spacecraft-inflicted injures.

Society of Super-Heroes
On an alternate Earth just after World War 2, Abin Sur assists in a war against Vandal Savage's inter-dimensional army. This Abin had horns, making him look like the classic archetype of Satan, a fact he is well aware of. He is then called upon to protect the entire multiverse against a rampaging cosmic army. Assisted by dozens of other heroes, they manage to force a stalemate. This Abin continues his heroism by joining the cross-dimensional team called 'Justice Incarnate'.

Superman: Red Son
In Superman: Red Son, Sur's spacecraft was the UFO that crashed at Roswell. Sur died shortly after the crash, and it is mentioned that J. Edgar Hoover arranged for Sur and his ship to be hidden in Area 51. In 1978, John F. Kennedy arranges for Lex Luthor to be allowed to examine the wreckage to develop weapons to use against Superman, in this setting the ruler of the Soviet Union.

Superman: Last Son of Earth
In the story, Superman: Last Son of Earth, Abin Sur failed to protect Earth from a meteor that nearly destroyed the planet, resulting in the deaths of all but one million people, due to him being preoccupied by another conflict elsewhere in his sector. He is later seen towards the end of the novel picking up Kal-El's Green Lantern Power Battery and Ring due to the latter's resignation from the Corps.

Superman/Batman: Absolute Power
In Superman/Batman: Absolute Power, Sur's ring is passed on to Uncle Sam when Wonder Woman attempts to rally a resistance against the dictatorship of Superman and Batman.

World's Finest
In Elseworld's Finest: Supergirl & Batgirl, a world with no male protectors of Gotham or Metropolis, Abin has been a long-time member of the Justice Society. He bonds closely with Supergirl, as Abin had visited Krypton many times and she treasures his recollections of her long-lost home planet.

In other media

Television
 Abin Sur appears in the Challenge of the Super Friends episode "Secret Origins of the Super Friends", voiced by Dick Ryal. Lex Luthor travels back in time in an attempt to steal Abin's ring before Hal Jordan can get it, but the Super Friends travel back in time to foil his plot.
 Abin Sur appears in the Superman: The Animated Series episode "In Brightest Day...", voiced by an uncredited Peter Mark Richman. This version was killed by Sinestro while his power ring chose Kyle Rayner.
 Abin Sur appears in the Robot Chicken DC Comics Special. This version was killed by a bear.
 Abin Sur appears in Teen Titans Go! episode "Orangins".

Film

 Abin Sur appears in Justice League: The New Frontier, voiced by Corey Burton. This version was caught in the explosion of a US spacecraft called the Flying Cloud while it was traveling to Mars. Due in part to Hal Jordan co-piloting the spacecraft, Abin passed his power ring on to him before he dies of his wounds.
 Abin Sur appears in Green Lantern: First Flight, voiced by Richard McGonagle. This version possesses horn-like appendages and four-fingered hands. He was tasked by the Guardians of the Universe to work undercover in Kanjar Ro's gang after they stole the yellow element. However, one of Kanjar's underlings discovered Abin's identity and mortally wounded him. After stealing a ship, Abin crash-landed on Earth, was found by Hal Jordan, and passed his power ring on to him before he died of his wounds.
 Abin Sur appears in Green Lantern: Emerald Knights, voiced by Arnold Vosloo. Similarly to the events of "Green Lantern: Secret Origin", this version previously worked with Sinestro and was warned of his impending death and Sinestro's betrayal by Atrocitus. Additionally, his power ring was originally wielded by Avra, the first Green Lantern to use their ring to create constructs.
 Abin Sur appears in Green Lantern, portrayed by Temuera Morrison. This version previously fought Parallax and used a starship to evacuate the populations of planets that the entity targeted. Additionally, Abin is stated by Sinestro to be impertinent, rash, volatile, and opinionated. After being fatally wounded by Parallax, Abin uses one of his starship's escape pods to escape, but crash-lands on Earth and passes his power ring onto Hal Jordan before he dies. Abin's body is subsequently discovered and taken by the Department of Extranormal Operations (DEO), who task Hector Hammond with performing the autopsy, which results in Hammond being infected by Parallax's DNA.
 The Flashpoint incarnation of Abin Sur makes a non-speaking cameo appearance in Justice League: The Flashpoint Paradox. This version died before he could pass on his power ring to Hal Jordan and his body and spaceship were recovered by the U.S. government, which they later use in an attempt to stop the war between Atlantis and Themyscira.
 The Superman: Red Son incarnation of Abin Sur appears in the self-titled film adaptation. Following his death, this version and his ship were discovered by the U.S. in 1967 off-screen. After several failed attempts at removing his power ring for study before cutting off the finger it was on, President John F. Kennedy and Lex Luthor bring in Colonel Hal Jordan to determine if he can use the ring. By 1983, U.S. scientists eventually reverse-engineer the ring and grant its capabilities to Jordan and a small team of soldiers so they could fight the Soviet Superman.

Merchandise
 A figure of Abin Sur was released in Mattel's DC Universe Classics line as part of a two-pack with Hal Jordan. Additionally, a figure of Abin as a Black Lantern was released individually in a later wave.
 A figure of the Green Lantern film incarnation of Abin Sir was released in the associated tie-in toy line.

References

External links
DC Guide entry for Abin Sur

Fictional professors
Comics characters introduced in 1959
Characters created by John Broome
Characters created by Gil Kane
DC Comics extraterrestrial superheroes
Green Lantern Corps officers
DC Comics male superheroes
Fictional people from the 19th-century